The 32d Intelligence Squadron is a unit of the United States Air Force 707th Intelligence, Surveillance and Reconnaissance Group located at Fort George G. Meade, Maryland.

Overview
The 32d Intelligence Squadron is a specialized organization that consists of teams of intelligence professionals who support global power and secure and maintain information superiority by conducting operations that support Air Force, joint, combined, and special operations in peacetime and in war.

It provides effective organization, control, technical guidance, training, support, products, and tasking for ongoing intelligence analysis and dissemination activities.  Serves the Department of Defense and other customers as directed, providing the core capability assisting the National Security Agency mission, through around-the-clock operations in support of national and tactical objectives.  Performs information operations through multiple sources for national, theater, and tactical customers.

History

World War II
The squadron was established in mid-1943 as a tactical reconnaissance and photographic mapping squadron. Initial squadron training was under the Third Air Force, before it was deployed to the Mediterranean Theater of Operations and became part of Fifteenth Air Force in southern Italy in August 1945.

Equipped primarily with unarmed Lockheed F-5 Lightnings, the squadron flew hazardous long-range intelligence and photo-mapping missions over enemy-held Italy and Occupied Europe, to get pictures required for the aerial war against the Axis powers. Initially it flew most missions over enemy-occupied Italy, Corsica and Sardinia, later flying missions over the Balkans. After the German surrender in May 1945, the squadron's personnel were demobilized in Italy during the summer of 1945, and the squadron was inactivated as a paper unit in the United States during October.

United States Air Forces in Europe

In 1952 the squadron was reactivated as a North Atlantic Treaty Organization (NATO) tactical reconnaissance unit to be based in France as a result of the United States Cold War military buildup in Europe. It was activated by the transfer of the equipment and personnel of the Alabama Air National Guard 157th Tactical Reconnaissance Squadron, which had been federalized and brought to active duty during the Korean War. It took over the Lockheed RF-80A Shooting Star aircraft of the ANG unit, and trained for daylight reconnaissance missions.

The squadron, however was stationed at Fürstenfeldbruck Air Base in West Germany due to the uncompleted facilities at Toul-Rosières Air Base. Weather conditions in Germany severely restricted the training operations of the assigned RF-80As. The squadron frequently deployed to Nouasseur Air Base, Morocco during the winter of 1952-53 where the photo conditions were excellent.

The squadron moved to Spangdahlem Air Base, West Germany in May 1953 where all of the elements of the parent 10th TRW were assembled at one base. It re-equipped with the Republic RF-84F Thunderflash in 1955, as the RF-80s were deemed not mission-capable against the Soviet Mikoyan-Gurevich MiG-15.

In January 1958, the squadron was moved to Phalsbourg-Bourscheid Air Base, France while the runway at Spangdahlem was under repair and renovation. In March 1958, the squadron was reassigned to the 66th Tactical Reconnaissance Wing, which was moving to Phalsbourg from Sembach Air Base due to poor runway conditions. During May, the Thunderflashes were replaced by McDonnell RF-101C Voodoos, which was the fastest tactical reconnaissance aircraft ever flown by the USAF.

Routine training operations were flown from Laon for over seven years. In 1965 the squadron was again reassigned; to the 26th Tactical Reconnaissance Wing, which was being formed at Toul-Rosières Air Base. On 7 March 1966, French President Charles De Gaulle announced that France would withdraw from NATO's military structure but not leave the political organization. He gave NATO forces one year (until 1 April 1967) to depart France.

As a result, the 26th Tactical Reconnaissance Wing was relocated to Ramstein Air Base, West Germany. As part of the move from Toul, the 32d moved to England, where it rejoined the 10th Wing, now stationed at RAF Alconbury. It sent its RF-101s back to the United States, and at Alconbury received new McDonnell Douglas RF-4C Phantom II aircraft.

The 32d flew the RF-4C at Alconbury for the next ten years, before being inactivated in 1976. The advent of reconnaissance satellites made tactical reconnaissance less and less necessary by the mid-1970s. This, along with the need for budget reductions after the end of the Vietnam War caused a reduction in the numbers of frontline tactical reconnaissance aircraft. On 1 January 1976, the squadron was the first of two squadrons of the 10th Wing to be inactivated that year.

Intelligence operations
In 1991, Electronic Security Command reorganized its intelligence units at Ft George G. Meade, Maryland, organizing the 6941st Electronic Security Squadron there as a Major Command Controlled (MAJCON) unit.  In the early 1990s, the Air Force eliminated this type of unit (commonly called a "four-digit" unit) by replacing them or consolidating them with Air Force Controlled (AFCON) units.  In 1993, the two units were consolidated as the 32d Intelligence Squadron.

Lineage
 32d Tactical Reconnaissance Squadron
 Constituted as the 45th Reconnaissance Squadron (Fighter) on 25 June 1943
 Activated on 1 July 1943
 Redesignated 32d Photographic Reconnaissance Squadron on 11 August 1943
 Inactivated on 28 October 1945
 Redesignated 32d Tactical Reconnaissance Squadron, Photographic-Jet on 25 June 1952
 Redesignated 32 Tactical Reconnaissance Squadron on 1 October 1966
 Reactivated on 10 July 1952
 Inactivated 1 January 1976
 Consolidated with the 32d Intelligence Squadron on 1 October 1993

 32d Intelligence Squadron
 Designated as the 6941st Electronic Security Squadron and activated on 1 Oct 1991
 Redesignated 32d Intelligence Squadron on 1 Oct 1993 and consolidated with the 32d Tactical Reconnaissance Squadron

Assignments
 426th Reconnaissance Group, 1 July 1943
 III Reconnaissance Command (later III Tactical Air Command), 11 August 1943
 90th Photographic Wing, c. 20 April 1944 (attached to 5th Photographic Group after 30 April 1944)
 5th Photographic Group (later 5th Reconnaissance Group), 15 November 1944 – 28 October 1945
 10th Tactical Reconnaissance Group, 10 July 1952
 10th Tactical Reconnaissance Wing, 8 December 1957 (attached to 66th Tactical Reconnaissance Wing after 8 January 1958)
 66th Tactical Reconnaissance Wing, 8 March 1958
 26th Tactical Reconnaissance Wing, 1 October 1965
 10th Tactical Reconnaissance Wing, 15 August 1966 – 1 January 1976
 6940th Electronic Security Wing 1 October 1991
 694th Electronic Security Wing (later 694th Intelligence Wing, 694th Intelligence Group), 1 October 1991
 70th Operations Group, 1 May 2005
 70th Intelligence, Surveillance, and Reconnaissance Group, 1 January 2009
 707th Intelligence, Surveillance, and Reconnaissance Group, 7 October 2009 – present

Stations
 Gainesville Army Air Field, Texas, 1 July 1943
 Will Rogers Field, Oklahoma, 4 January-24 March 1944
 San Severo Airfield, Italy, 28 April 1944
 Bari Airfield, Italy, 11 August–October 1945
 Camp Kilmer, New Jersey, 26–28 October 1945
 Fürstenfeldbruck Air Base, West Germany, 10 July 1952
 Spangdahlem Air Base, West Germany, 17 May 1953
 Phalsbourg-Bourscheid Air Base, France, 31 July 1957
 Toul-Rosières Air Base, France, 17 October 1960
 Laon-Couvron Air Base, France, 1 March 1962
 Toul-Rosières Air Base, France, 1 July 1965
 RAF Alconbury, England, 15 August 1966 – 1 January 1976
 Ft George G. Meade, Maryland, 1 October 1991 – present

Aircraft

 North American B-25 Mitchell, 1943–1944
 de Havilland Mosquito, 1944
 Douglas A-20 Havoc, 1944
 Lockheed F-5 Lightning, 1944–1945
 Lockheed RF-80A Shooting Star, 1952–1956
 Republic RF-84F Thunderflash, 1955–1958
 McDonnell RF-101C Voodoo, 1958–1966
 McDonnell Douglas RF-4C Phantom II, 1966–1976

References

Notes
 Explanatory Notes

 Citations

Bibliography

External links

032